Jeff McWhinney was born in 1960 in Belfast, Northern Ireland. He is a leader in the UK deaf community.

Early life 
McWhinney was born into a deaf family in Belfast, both his brother and sister are deaf.

During the Troubles in Northern Ireland loyalists killed his cousin because she married a Roman Catholic.

McWhinney was raised in a bilingual environment, his family who used both British Sign Language (BSL) and as some may say, Northern Ireland Sign Language (NISL) and English. He came to pick up Irish Sign Language (ISL) from the community. He later learned to communicate in American Sign Language (ASL), and French Belgian Sign Language (LSFB).

He was educated at the Jordanstown Schools in Belfast, where there was a teacher who also taught his father. He then went to Mary Hare Grammar School for the deaf in the 1970s.

Deaf rights and organisations 
In Belfast, McWhinney was frustrated by the Deaf clubs and organisations that were not managed by deaf people. He started the Northern Ireland Workshop with the Deaf which invited speakers such as Paddy Ladd and George Montgomery to speak about Deaf liberation.

He became the first Secretary of the Euro Youth Deaf Council.

His big break in his career within charities for deaf people, came about in 1984 when he worked for Breakthrough (now DeafPlus), a charity working towards integration between deaf and hearing people.

In 1995 he became chief executive officer (CEO) of the British Deaf Association (BDA), one of the largest societies for deaf people in the UK. From this position, he was involved in gaining UK Government recognition of British Sign Language as an official language.

He also became the Director of the Greenwich Association of Disabled People. Jeff has established eleven Deaf Image campaign groups in London and a number of sign language interpretation services.

In 1999 McWhinney "challenged a decision made by staff at Woolwich Crown Court that he could not sit as a juror because of his disability, [he however] failed to have the decision overturned".

"SignVideo" company 
He left his BDA management post in September 2004 to start up a new video technology enterprise, as managing director of Significan't (UK) Ltd. This company was considered to the fastest growing social enterprise staffed entirely by sign language users.  He introduced the videophone to the deaf community and established the SignVideo Contact Centre, a centre which provides instant access to sign language interpreting through video conferencing. With the Greater London Authority and London Connects he succeeded in securing a grant of £500,000 from the Office of the Deputy Prime Minister's e-innovations programme.  The SignVideo partners are CISCO, Tandberg, Prime Business Solutions and Tiger Communications. With this quartlet from the leading technology companies the platform developed by the SignVideo Contact Centre enabled full access by videoconferencing through many different avenues from the legacy ISDN videophones to the latest in 3G video mobiles. The SignVideo Contact Centre, was the runner up of the prestigious national e-Government Awards for 2005 the first deaf or disabled enterprise to receive this recognition.

In 2007 Jeff McWhinney presented the concept of applying the latest in technology to demolish the barriers to social inclusion for deaf and disabled people, using SignVideo as an example, to the School of Government attended by senior civil servants and as a result of his paper was one of the five enterprises selected by Trevor Reed and Lindsey Spancer the then Prime Ministers to share a stage with him at a conference attended by the top two tiers of senior civil servants.  That year SignVideo was selected as one of the three preferred suppliers in video interpreting to the Department of Work and Pensions and was the sole provider for the period 2008–2010 with the other two preferred suppliers ceasing their operations.

In 2010 SignVideo went national establishing partnerships with Deaf Action in Edinburgh, Scotland.   That year SignVideo brought the video interpreter to smartphones and tablets by launching its Android app and subsequently the iOS app for iPhones and iPads.

2011 saw SignVideo launch BSL LIVE, a world first live video interpreting service that enabled deaf BSL users to communicate immediately with the service providers through their own websites.  After this service was taken up by public authorities, British Telecom became the first commercial company to launch SignVideo BSL LIVE on its website. This has expanded to three banks – Lloyds TSB, Bank of Scotland and the Halifax.

Jeff McWhinney has pushed the transition of the British Deaf Association from a Deaf organisation (with the 'Wheelchair Mentality') into a BSL organisation. In his September 2004 interview with SIGN MATTERS, he commented: "The word ‘Deaf’ has several different perceptions out there ranging from those deaf through old age to Deaf BSL users. Also there are hidden groups within the sign language community such as Children Of Deaf Adults (CODAs). Working for the sign language community means we can include all these people in our campaigns for language rights. A good quote I have used often express how I feel about this subject. Hearing people love English and its richness however it is seen by the Deaf as a tool to achieve equality. But no-one realise that Deaf people love sign language and its richness in the same manner above! While the new vision is great, the real challenge for the new concept of Sign Language community is whether Deaf people are ready to accept that hearing sign language users belongs to this community. I led a group of Deaf youths in Finland back in 1987 and someone in the group asked our guide how many staff in the Finnish Association of the Deaf were Deaf. The guy started counting, then asked 'why do you want to know?' I thought this was fantastic, that it didn't matter to him. British Deaf people have yet to arrive at this stage and I look forward to that!"

References

External links
Sign Community
Signvideo Awards nomination (.doc file)
McWhinney's resignation
Significan't

1960 births
Living people
People from Belfast
Deaf activists
Deaf people from Northern Ireland
BSL users